The 2010 U.S. Virgin Islands gubernatorial election was held on November 2, 2010, and won by incumbent Democratic Governor John de Jongh. De Jongh was elected to his first term in 2006 with 57.3% of the vote over Kenneth Mapp.

Governor John de Jongh was elected to a second, full year-term, over independent Kenneth Mapp, in what was essentially a rematch of the 2006 gubernatorial runoff election.

Candidates

Democratic
Governor: John de Jongh incumbent Governor (first elected in 2006)
Lieutenant Governor: Gregory Francis, incumbent Lieutenant Governor of the U.S. Virgin Islands

Defeated in primary
Adlah Donastorg Jr., seven-term U.S. Virgin Islands Senator (since January 1995); 2006 candidate for governor. Donastorg announced his candidacy on July 25, 2010.
Samuel Baptiste, Donastorg's running mate Baptiste worked as an assistant commissioner of Property and Procurement under former Governor Roy Schneider. He was also a 2002 candidate for governor as a Republican.
Gerard Luz James II, former Lieutenant Governor and president of the fifth Constitutional Convention
Glen J. Smith, James' running mate, teacher and educator
James O'Bryan Jr., two-term chairman of the Democratic Party of the Virgin Islands, former Senator, and Administrator of Saint Thomas and Water Island
Pamela Richards Samuel, O'Bryan's running mate, former Commissioner of Tourism

Independent
Kenneth Mapp, former Lieutenant Governor; gubernatorial candidate in 2006
Dr. Malik Sekou, Mapp's running mate. Sekeu is a political science professor and department chair at the University of the Virgin Islands. He has written on history, social science and political science. He had previously been elected to the Virgin Islands Board of Education.

Independent Citizens Movement

Withdrew
Terrence "Positive" Nelson, U.S. Virgin Islands Senator, member of the Independent Citizens Movement (ICM) party

Republican
None

Primary election
The gubernatorial primary was held on Saturday, September 11, 2010. The only contested primary was for the Democratic nomination.

In the four-way Democratic primary, incumbent Governor John de Jongh and Lieutenant Governor Gregory Francis won the nomination with 7,487 votes (53%). Senator Adlah Donastorg Jr., who ran against de Jongh in 2006, placed second with 4,300 votes. Former Lieutenant Governor Gerard Luz James came in third place in the primary with 1,823 votes, while James O'Bryan Jr. placed fourth with 423 votes.
Governor John de Jongh garnered more votes than all three of his Democratic challengers combined, who together earned 6,555 votes. In response to his 53% victory, de Jongh stated, "The combination of their votes by no means comes close to what we achieved this evening ... That feels very good." Second place candidate Senator Adlah Donastorg left the Virgin Islands Legislature when his term expired in January 2011, after seven terms in office. He told the Virgin Islands Daily News that he will return to the private sector after the election.

Former Lieutenant Governor Gerard Luz James, told the media he "accepted the people's decision," but also added in response to the election, "The people of the Virgin Islands showed me today that they really and truly endure mistreatment, endure corruption, endure mismanagement, and they also endure maltreatment to each other ... The only thing that I can see is continued destruction, and it's sad, sad, sad." James stated that he would not endorse Governor de Jongh for a second term stating, "Why should I endorse anyone when it shows me truly that the people don't want to have anything that is right?" James O'Bryan, who with running mate Pamela Richards Samuel received 432 votes, said, "The people have spoken, I respect their wishes, and I will go forward with this episode from now on." With the completion of the Democratic primary, Governor John de Jongh went on to face independent candidate Kenneth Mapp in the general election on November 2, 2010. de Jongh won the Election with 56.27% of the vote.

Primary election results

General election
The gubernatorial general election was held on November 2, 2010, with incumbent Governor John de Jongh being challenged by independent Kenneth Mapp, a former Lieutenant Governor of the U.S. Virgin Islands, for a second consecutive executive election. De Jongh had narrowly defeated Mapp in the 2006 gubernatorial runoff election.

The incumbent gubernatorial team of Gov. John de Jongh and Lt. Governor Gregory Francis won re-election to a second term in office, garnering 17,535 votes. The independent ticket of Kenneth Mapp and Malik Sekou placed second in the election, earning 13,580 votes. Mapp initially refused to concede despite trailing by a wide margin, citing voting irregularities.

Ralph T. O'Neal, the Premier of the neighboring British Virgin Islands, called Governor de Jongh on November 4, 2010, to congratulate on his re-election.

Endorsements

Polling

General election results

References

External links
Official Candidate List
Governor John de DeJongh and Lt. Gov. Francis official campaign
Adlah Donastorg official campaign
Gerard Luz James for Governor official campaign
James O'Bryan/Samuel 2010 official campaign
Ken Mapp for Governor official campaign

2010 United States gubernatorial elections
2010 elections in the Caribbean
Gubernatorial